David Fisiiahi is a New Zealand rugby league footballer who represented Tonga at the 2000 World Cup and currently plays for the Ellerslie Eagles. He is the identical twin of fellow Tongan International Paul.

Playing career
In 2000 he joined the Eastern Tornadoes in the new Bartercard Cup competition.

By 2004 he was playing with the Otahuhu-Ellerslie Leopards.

He played for the Auckland Lions in the 2007 Bartercard Cup, scoring a try in the final. He also played matches for the Lions in the NSWRL Premiership, debuting on March 25.

Fisiiahi currently plays for the Ellerslie Eagles in the Auckland Rugby League competition.

Representative career
Fisiiahi represented both the New Zealand Residents and Tonga in 2000. He represented Tonga at the 2000 World Cup, playing in three matches. Also was selected for Niue for pacific games 2009 as he is part Niuean.

References

Living people
New Zealand rugby league players
Tonga national rugby league team players
Otahuhu Leopards players
Eastern Tornadoes players
Auckland rugby league team players
Mount Albert Lions players
Ellerslie Eagles players
New Zealand twins
Twin sportspeople
Identical twins
New Zealand sportspeople of Tongan descent
Rugby league centres
Year of birth missing (living people)